Thomas English (9 July 1820 – 17 December 1884) was a leading colonial architect in South Australia, Mayor of Adelaide (1862–1863), and a member of the South Australian Legislative Council 1865–1878 and 1882–1884.

English was born in Maryport, Cumberland, England, and arrived in Adelaide on 11 January 1850 on the barque Richardson.

English was Minister of Works, South Australia, and a member of the South Australian Legislative Council from 1 March 1865 to 1 August 1878 and from 29 May 1882 till his death, and was Commissioner of Public Works in the John Hart Government from 23 October 1865 to March 1966, and in the James Boucaut Ministry from the latter date till 3 May 1867.

His work as architect included the new Kent Town Brewery buildings at the corner of Rundle Street and Dequetteville Terrace, Kent Town, completed in 1876  for E. T. Smith. He was for a time partner with brother-in-law Henry Brown (28 August 1820 – 30 May 1881) in the building firm of English & Brown, (later Brown & Thompson), who developed the Glen Ewin quarry, the source of freestone for many of Adelaide's public buildings. 
George Klewitz Soward served his papers with English then joined him in partnership as English & Soward which continued after the death of English with his son J. W. English (died 1926).

English died at his residence in Parkside, South Australia on 17 December 1884.

The Hundred of English was named after English when it was proclaimed in 1866. It includes the towns of Robertstown and Point Pass in the Mid North of South Australia.

References
Thomas English, Architects Database, unisa.edu.au

 

Mayors and Lord Mayors of Adelaide
1884 deaths
1820 births
Members of the South Australian Legislative Council
People from Maryport
English emigrants to colonial Australia
19th-century Australian politicians